The following is a list of characters who appear in Powerpuff Girls Z, an anime version of The Powerpuff Girls.

Powerpuff Girls Z
Unlike their original counterparts, the heroines of the anime reimagining are ordinary eighth graders who are not related to each other or the Professor. Instead of always being superheroes, they are given the power to transform into the Powerpuff Girls Z. In the English dub, they are simply called Blossom, Bubbles and Buttercup regardless of whether they are transformed or not.

Momoko "Blossom" Akatsutsumi / Hyper Blossom
 / 

The leader and first member of the Powerpuff Girls Z with orange hair with a red bow, and pink eyes. She uses a yo-yo as her signature weapon, but she can use her bow as a weapon if she doesn't have her yo-yo. Like the original, she's the self-proclaimed leader of the team. However, she is extremely ditzy, a bit boy-crazy, given to crushes and romantic fantasies. She wears a midriff dress in normal clothing. She is very familiar with the mahou shojo genre, along with some typical anime/super sentai concepts and is regarded as a "hero maniac" in school, especially by Kaoru.  Momoko also has a strong appetite for sugary foods. Momoko was the first to encounter Mojo Jojo at the park after buying candy. If she doesn't eat sweets for a long time she can get very cranky.  But she is getting used to it.  Although often distracted and has been known to whine, Momoko tries her best to protect Tokyo City, lead the girls, and help her friends regardless of her situation. In one instance, when Momoko is unable to transform, she tries to fight alongside Miyako and Kaoru wearing a sentai hero mask. Often she can be very clever and crafty when needed, usually being the first to come up with a plan to trick or defeat a monster that the girls are having trouble with. She has a younger sister named Kuriko. She plans to be married in the future. Her theme color is pink (also known as the color red). She is represented by hearts.

Miyako "Bubbles" Gōtokuji / Rolling Bubbles
 / )

The second member of the Powerpuff Girls Z team with lemon yellow hair with a sky blue hair clip, and matching eyes who uses a bubble wand as her signature weapon. Compared to her original counterpart, who is known for being the most childish of the three, Miyako is comparatively mature and often acts as the mediator in many situations and tries to calm her teammates down when in such situations. However, she is the ditziest member of the team, often appearing a bit clueless, and doesn't seem to understand her powers completely, along with a few other things. She is also very polite and always uses honorifics at the end of names and ends most of her sentences with "desu wa". She is more concerned with shopping, her appearance and her outfits, and perhaps because of this, she seems to be very popular among her male classmates. While she seems oblivious to the many boys that love her, she's already in love with a boy named Takaaki, a boy on whom she has had a crush ever since she was six years old. She retains her hairstyle during the reimagining, but her pigtails are slightly longer and curl into ringlets. She also uses curlers (3 balls on each pigtail) when going to bed. Miyako is a compassionate, gentle, and innocent character, possessing a love for animals and her favorite doll, Octi. Her theme color is blue. She is represented by bubbles.

Kaoru "Buttercup" Matsubara / Powered Buttercup
 /  

The third and final member of the Powerpuff Girls Z with dark grey hair with two green hair clips, and green eyes who uses a giant mallet as her signature weapon. As the original Buttercup, she is a tomboy and is the most easily enraged of the three. Kaoru is known at school for being the most athletic girl as she plays tennis, practices martial arts, and numerous other activities, and spends a great deal of time watching sports on television. She is especially good at soccer due to her strengthened determination after receiving new soccer cleats when she was younger. This may be part of the reason why she has so many fangirls, much to her dismay. She is disgusted by anything girly, especially skirts, which makes wearing the Powerpuff uniform a bit more awkward. She speaks with a hard and masculine edge and rarely uses honorifics when speaking. Under her tough exterior, she has a kind heart and also shows a grand sense of humour. Kaoru lives with her parents and her two brothers, the father of which is a professional masked-wrestler. Her theme color is green. She is represented by stars.

Supporting characters

Allies

In Powerpuff Girls Z, Professor Utonium has a son named Ken Kitazawa, who is responsible for all those affected by the Chemical Z lights, especially the Powerpuff Girls Z. Professor Utonium was originally experimenting with the substance Chemical X and strove to find a way to change its chemical properties. Professor Utonium has created several inventions throughout the series; the most important one being his Chemical Z Particle Ray, which allows him to transform those affected by the lights back to normal (although it doesn't prevent recurring transformations nor is it able to work on all black light victims). He seems to be aware of the effect Ken's lack of a mother has had on his son, assuming that it had caused him to be a bully to the girls. However, this does not change his behavior towards Ken. He appears to be a gentle father figure like the original Professor Utonium was in The Powerpuff Girls. He treats the girls like members of his family and is very close to the Mayor and Miss Bellum. While he is very gentle and serious, Professor Utonium may, at times, act a little less mature than he usually does. In episode 37, when the Powerpuff Girls Z are "grounded" from using their powers for a day when they have to take a test in school, Professor Utonium fills in for them, donning an exosuit with a laser beam gun and rocket pack, calling himself "Professor Puff Z" (this is most likely based on the American cartoon episode "Powerprof" in which he also donned a fighting suit but drove the girls crazy with lame one-liners during battles). He also appears to have a mecha that looks like Professor Puff Z, which he uses against the Mojo Robo. Although he seems unsuccessful at first, he is able to defeat Mojo Jojo, Fuzzy Lumpkins, and the Amoeba Boys. His main attack is the Uto Beam. At the end of the episode, Ken, Peach and himself call themselves "Powerpuff Boys Z" as their own self-proclaimed superhero team.    
              
 

Professor Utonium's eight-year-old son who is somewhat responsible for turning regular girls into the Powerpuff Girls Z and numerous other characters into villains using Chemical Z. He used it to blast a glacier in order to set the weather back to normal, but the impact resulted in the explosion of several lights, which affected all those who came in contact with it. Despite being younger than the girls, he acts a lot more mature and the education he receives from his father is considered more advanced than what the girls learn in their school, earning his PhD at an early age. Ken, in a later episode, attended school in order to gain social skills and make friends. While he considers grade school life boring, he has made several friends, including Jou, who was originally his rival and Kuriko who is Momoko's young sister. Ken sees the girls as older sisters and has to often put up with them, though he still cares for them deeply. Ken interchanges between calling Professor Utonium "Dad" and "Professor". During a serious situation (such as a monster attack or investigation) he will try to refer to Utonium as "Professor," but in less serious situations (like packing a lunch) he will call him "Dad." Ken often corrects himself, because he usually uses the wrong honorific (e.g. "Dad, I mean, Professor"). In the twenty-sixth episode, it is revealed that Ken's mother works on a space station, therefore making her very busy and unable to be with Ken. Thanks to the girls and Santa Claus (whom he believed did not exist at first based on a 70% possibility), he was able to see her and is now able to communicate with her clearly on the lab's monitor. In episode 37, when the Powerpuff Girls Z are "grounded" from using their powers for a day when they have to take a test in school, Ken fills in for them, donning a superhero suit consisting of a black bodysuit, a white cape, white gloves, white boots, a red vest with gold shoulder pads and a yellow "Z" on it, and a blue helmet with the yellow letters "KK" on it, while brandishing a blue polearm with a yellow "U" at the end, and calling himself "Kamikaze Ken Z". Despite having no powers or attacks, he uses traps and other props as weapons when he defends their lab from the Gangreen Gang, ultimately driving them off by tricking them into drinking bottles of hot sauce (thinking they were the containers of Chemical Z). Ken's pre-production art bears a strong resemblance to Dexter from Dexter's Laboratory, even the current incarnation. However, in one of the special edition  booklets, it is explained the design originated from Kid Utonium from the original series.
             
 

Peach is Ken's pet robot dog who was also affected by a white Chemical Z ray, gaining the ability to talk, as well as a considerable boost in intelligence. Peach's shout prompts the girls to transform either in person or through a long-distance communication device, although a modification to the girls' compacts allows them to transform on their own. Additionally, Peach can re-summon the girls' powers, even when their powers are drained. Peach is also capable of sniffing out those who are affected by the black rays, white rays, and Him's black particles. The black ray monsters/villains that have been sniffed by Peach are stored in his data banks for later reference. This ability, however, is hindered if his target is wearing heavy cosmetics (as was the case with Sedusa). Peach is also capable of sniffing and identifying others more clearly than other dogs, even when someone's appearance has been completely changed.
 

The mayor of New Townsville (Tokyo City), whose design is distinctly different from his American counterpart, as he is of normal height and has no monocle or top hat. While less extreme in comparison to the Mayor of Townsville, the Mayor is very childish and has a very short attention span. He seems to worry quite a lot when the girls are fighting, and wishes that they could cause a little less damage. The Mayor, like many of the characters in the anime, loves sweets. The Mayor also has a younger brother, who is the Principal of the school. It was through him that Miss Bellum and the Mayor were able rearrange the classes, so that the girls would be in the same class. However, the Mayor and the Principal, don't always get along, and even the most minor of things will set off an argument, which often time leads to name calling. He also deals with his brother when the girls aren't doing well in class due to them skipping class to save the city.

Mayor Mayer's assistant, who has blonde hair compared to the original's red hair. Usually, Sara Bellum covers her face with a tablet computer, which has lipstick imprinted on it. While the mayor is different from his original counterpart and is more competent, Sara Bellum in the anime still does most of the mayor's work for him in a manner similar to the original Sara Bellum, and still appears to be the brains of the operation.

The girls' teacher who is very pretty and loved by her male students, although the female students don't like her as much, especially Princess Morbucks. Miss Keane, like the original, is kind and incredibly patient.

Family members

Momoko's eight-year-old sister, and she is just as hyper and addicted to the sentai/hero genre as her older sister. She is very independent and likes to pretend she is a heroine. She admires the Powerpuff Girls Z and wishes to be a heroine just like them. She admires Rolling Bubbles and Powered Buttercup, but shows little favor for Hyper Blossom who, unbeknownst to her, is actually her own sister. She is also always looking for new ways to annoy her sister. She appears to be quite interested in Ken, especially when she realizes that he knows her sister. Similarly, Ken seems interested in her because of her resemblance to Blossom.

Miyako' grandmother, who she lives with in a large traditional-looking house. She is gentle sounding and usually gets distracted by nostalgic things, but she can also be strict when it comes to manners. You also never see her eyes ever open, as they are always closed to portray a happy feeling. She is a traditional Japanese woman.

Kaoru's father, a professional wrestler and loving family man who is never seen without his mask. He left for Mexico when Kaoru was young, and studied the art of the luchador after experiencing a losing streak that could have cost him his career. His teacher was severely injured in what is implied to be his final match. The Masked Mexico was given his teacher's mask, which in true lucha spirit, he never removes, except when taking a shower. Since then, Kaoru has forgotten what her father's face looks like. There is no photograph in their family album that shows what his real face looks like either, mirroring Miss Bellum's running gag. After he wins the match against Giant Panda Mask, Kaoru finally got to see her father's face for the first time since before he left for Mexico, which is reportedly 'very handsome'.

Kaoru's mother. She is a very good cook and is exceptionally gentle in contrast to her husband and kids. She also likes to smile a lot.

Kaoru's older brother.

 

Kaoru's younger brother.

A long time ago in Edo, when Him was terrorizing its citizens, a man named Kennai Hiraga, who is modeled after Hiraga Gennai, created the special substance "Chemical X". Hiraga poured it on three girls: Momo, Omiya, and Okou. The substance changed their appearance, giving them new hairstyles, now similar to their present day counterparts and kimonos which the bottom portion is shorter than normal, resembling mini skirts, the colors match the Powerpuff Girls Z, and their sashes are black with the symbols of the Powerpuff Girls Z, as well as their own powers and weapons. The three faced and successfully defeated Him, whose weakness to the cold became his undoing. Together with Hiraga, they were able to drain Him's powers and seal his body in a coffin. The Great Edo ChakiChaki Girls can be seen as the heroines who preceded the present day Powerpuff Girls Z and may in fact be their ancestors. Because of his defeat, Him has a deep hatred towards the Great Edo ChakiChaki Girls and directs that hatred towards the Powerpuff Girls Z for their resemblance to them. Similarly to the Steamypuff Girls from the original Powerpuff Girls cartoon, they both stopped a great villain from a previous era.

A character who appears exclusively in the manga version. A popular kid in school who Momoko has a heavy crush on, though he finds her constantly annoying, despite being admiring her alter ego, Blossom.

Villains

Returning villains

An ordinary zoo monkey who was made fun of by people and decided to seek revenge on humanity after the ray from Chemical Z made him intelligent. He is physically more powerful than the original version of the character, able to fly and lay a dozen punches at one time. This version of Mojo frequently displays an immature attitude and makes the most childish flaws throughout his plans. While the original Mojo was portrayed as one of the most competent and genuinely threatening villains in the series, the anime version is more of a rather inept comic relief and is seen by the Powerpuff Girls Z as more of an annoying nuisance than a dangerous enemy. The anime Mojo also does not repeat himself redundantly as the original Mojo does, he ends most of his sentences with saying his name. He is the same size as the original, as the giant cape conceals his small figure.

Him is the most powerful enemy of the series, and it is safe to say that he is the main antagonist. Him is a demon, nothing more and nothing less than chaos itself. His biggest weakness is the cold. In ancient times, Him was dedicated to bring about the destruction of a small town, however, was defeated by the Great Edo ChakiChaki Girls who took advantage of Him's weakness which is cold or snow to lock him up and take part of their evil and save the mountains. But when Ken ended up destroying one of the icebergs in the bay of New Townsville, black lights were scattered all around New Townsville consequently, over producing and giving birth to the many villains in the city and a black light struck Him and woke him. It is also known that he releases a strange dust that was responsible for producing some villains.

In Powerpuff Girls Z, it is unknown who or what he was before being hit by the black light. Fuzzy looks almost exactly the same as his original counterpart: a large pink creature in overalls. This rendition of Fuzzy is as rude and destructive as the original, but is nice enough to help an old man or sign an autograph for a fan who likes his banjo playing, that is before going on a rampage. Like Mojo Jojo, he ends most of his sentences with "de mon da". He has a crush on Ms. Bellum.

Himeko is a bratty rich kid in the girls' class who is hit by the black light. Her powers are used based on her wanting to be recognized by people. Once she is back to normal however, she does not recall any events that occurred while she was evil. She has a strong dislike for Momoko, Miyako and Kaoru, trying to get them into trouble even when she is not evil.  She does, however, have some odd feeling of friendship toward them that she displays from time to time.  She has an older sister named Miko, who does everything better than her, and even draws attention by their parents. However, while she is somewhat jealous of Miko, she loves her sister very much and is always excited when she visits. Unlike the original cartoon series, both of her parents' faces are shown and her mother is alive and around. She has a cat named Sapphire, whose scream causes Himeko' transformation turning to Princess.

A group of amoeba brought to life by the black light.

 / 

Sakurako is a shy girl who runs a candy store. She has a crush on a boy named , and it is her jealousy towards him that leads her to be hit by the black lights, transforming her into Sedusa whenever she puts on some lipstick. As Sedusa, Sakurako can wear makeup to make herself look like anyone, as well as use her hair like tentacles, traits shared with her American counterpart, but unlike her American counterpart, Annie, as well as Sedusa, is in love with Souichiro, a regular client of her shop, rather than Professor Utonium.

These items form the basis of the Rowdyruff Boys’ weapons. Brick's weapon is actually Hyper Blossom's heart twisty straw, which he shoots spits fireballs at the girls, Boomer's weapon is Rolling Bubbles' used cotton bud used his own ear wax at opponents and Butch's weapon is Powred Buttercup's smelly gym sock which he would throw like a boomerang.

Original villains

Michel-(also known by his alter ego Gigi the Great) is an effeminate hairdresser with strange tastes in hair. He has a teddy bear that when wound up, compliments Michel and tells him that he's great. The teddy bear gets hit by the black light and grants Michel powers of hypnosis to make the customers to accept his eccentric hairstyle. The cause of his transformation is hearing compliments from the teddy bear, and to prevent any further transformations, Ken and the Powerpuff Girls Z replace the old recording on the teddy bear with a new one that insults Michel.

Himeko's older sister who always likes to stand out, which is often the cause of grief for her younger sister, although the two do care for each other. When she gets jealous of the Powerpuff Girls' fame, she has a suit developed that temporarily gives her powers exceeding the girls, naming her Shirogane Z in order to upstage them.

 and 

A pair of androids who appear as the main antagonists in the manga adaptation. They were created by a pair of scientists to act as their children, but were stolen by a group of thieves who reprogrammed them to take revenge on humanity before being hit by the black lights.

References

characters
Lists of anime and manga characters
Television characters introduced in 2006
Animated characters introduced in 2006